The William Bell was a pilot boat built in 1864 by shipbuilder Edward F. Williams at Greenpoint, Brooklyn for a group Sandy Hook Pilots. She was captured and burned by the Confederate raiding steamer CSS Tallahassee during the American Civil War. A second William Bell was constructed in 1864-1865 to replace the first one.

Construction and service

The William Bell was built in Greenpoint, Brooklyn, New York, in 1864 and launched on January 9, 1864 by shipbuilder Edward F. Williams of Greenpoint for the New York and Sandy Hook pilots: Joseph Henderson, William H. Anderson, John Van Dusen, and James Callahan. Williams sold the plans of the William Bell for $250, to the Delaware pilots.

Grocery and Ship Stores owner, John W. Avery, collected the money and made payments on behalf of the pilot owners. She cost about $16,000 to build, which was done under James Callahan's supervision, inspection and approval.

Her dimensions were 82 ft. in length; 22.6 ft. breadth of beam; 8 ft. depth of hold; and 118-tons.

The William Bell was an expensive boat. She was built of white oak, live oak, red cedar, locust, hackmatack, yellow pine, and white pine. Her deck was "without a butt or knot," fastened with galvanized spikes, and was made of long and fine planking. All trimmings on deck were of mahogany or brass; her cabin was of "rose wood, zebra wood, tulip and satin wood."

Civil War

The objective in capturing the vessels was to secure a pilot who could take the Tallahassee into Long Island Sound. The William Bell was 70 miles east southeast of Sandy Hook. In the book, "From Sandy Hook to 62", Charles Edward Russell, describes the chase of the Tallahassee cruiser against William Bell.

James Callahan was in command of the pilot boat at the time of the capture. The Confederate colonel, John Taylor Wood, fired three shots at the William Bell and ordered Callahan to come on board the Tallahassee. He then ordered his men to go on board the pilot boat and remove everything that was movable and bring it on board the Tallahassee. Wood then ordered the William Bell to be burned. Wood said "Turpentine her and set her on fire." 
The next day, Colonel Wood collided with packet ship Adriatic. Wood ordered every passenger on the Adriatic to be taken prisoner and put on the Tallahassee. He then captured another vessel, the bark Suliote, of Belfast, Maine. Passengers from the pilot boat William Bell, No. 24 and the burned ship Adriatic were transferred to the Suliote. James Callahan was ordered to pilot the Suliote into Sandy Hook, New York.

In the book, "From Sandy Hook to 62", Charles Edward Russell, described the chase of the Tallahassee cruiser against James Funk, No. 22.  The Tallahassee captured the James Funk and turned her into a tender and a decoy. Captain Wood used the pilot-boat to capture and burn other schooners and brigs. He then burned the James Funk, which he later regretted.

Construction and service for William Bell II

After the loss of the "William Bell", a second "William Bell" was constructed by Edward F. Williams, in 1864-65. She was two feet longer and had more beam. On May 7, 1865, the William Bell, No. 24 was launched from the yard of Edward F. Williams, Greenpoint, New York. Her dimensions were: Length of keel, 82 feet; breadth of beam, 21 feet; depth of hold, 8 feet. The price of boats had gone up because of the war so the second William Bell cost about $24,000. She was a duplicate of the first and was built for speed, beauty, and strength.

Out of service (1867)

On March 4, 1867, the pilot boat William Bell, No. 24, lay full of water, a mile inside of the outer bar, eighteen miles east of Montauk Point, near the village of Amagansett, Long Island. There were four pilots on board at the time she struck the beach in bad weather. She was part owned by Captain Joseph Henderson (5/16th); James Callahan (5/16); John Van Duzer (4/17); and William Anderson (2/16). She was partially insured. The vessel was reported as a total loss.

Compensation for their loss

On February 17, 1883, Henderson and Callahan petitioned the United States, via the Alabama Claims award, for compensation of their loss of the William Bell during the American Civil War. Joseph Henderson v. United States gives more information on these cases. Henderson and Callahan had to testify to their ownership and status as Sandy Hook pilots during the Court of Commissioners of Alabama Claims.

James Callahan filed a similar case in James Callahan v. The United States (No. 710). In his court case Callahan conducted a deposition on February 10, 1883, with his counsel and the counsel for the United States. In his deposition Callahan said that he was 70 years of age; lived in Brooklyn, N. Y.; was a Sandy Hook pilot for 38 years; that he owned 5/16 of the William Bell and was captain of the boat. He was asked to recount the capture of the William Bell and Adriatic by John Taylor Wood, captain of the Confederate CSS Tallahassee.

Edward F. Williams gave a deposition before the Court of Commissioners and said that he was the shipbuilder of the pilot boat William Bell, and that he built twelve Sandy Hook pilot boats. The William Bell was an "extraordinarily expensive boat to build in every respect; her decks were all trimmed with mahogany; she was copper-fastened to the top of her rail; from keel to rail; her ballast was all cast and fitted between the frames."

The final award, made on June 5, 1883, gave compensation of $9,289.59 to Henderson, who owned 5/16 shares in the William Bell and James Callahan, $9,410.14, who owned 5/16 shares, for a total award of $18,699.73. Although, this was less than the $24,000.00 amount claimed, it was a reasonable settlement.

See also
 List of Northeastern U. S. Pilot Boats

References

Service vessels of the United States
Schooners of the United States
Pilot boats
Ships built in Brooklyn
Maritime incidents in August 1864